Peter Rasmussen may refer to:

 Peter Rasmussen (badminton) (born 1974), Danish badminton player
 Peter Rasmussen (Counter-Strike player) (born 1993), Danish eSports player known as dupreeh
 Peter Rasmussen (filmmaker) (1956–2008), Australian film-maker
 Peter Rasmussen (footballer, born 1967), striker for AaB and Denmark
 Peter Rasmussen (footballer, born 1969), Danish midfielder for AB
 Peter Rasmussen (referee) (born 1975), Danish football referee
 Peter "dupreeh" Rasmussen, professional esports player